West Jutland is one of the 12 multi-member constituencies of the Folketing, the national legislature of Denmark. The constituency was established in 2007 following the public administration structural reform. It consists of the municipalities of Herning, Holstebro, Ikast-Brande, Lemvig, Ringkøbing-Skjern, Silkeborg, Skive, Struer and Viborg. The constituency currently elects 13 of the 179 members of the Folketing using the open party-list proportional representation electoral system. At the 2022 general election it had 385,528 registered electors.

Electoral system
West Jutland currently elects 13 of the 179 members of the Folketing using the open party-list proportional representation electoral system. Constituency seats are allocated using the D'Hondt method. Compensatory seats are calculated based on the national vote and are allocated using the Sainte-Laguë method, initially at the provincial level and finally at the constituency level. Only parties that reach any one of three thresholds stipulated by section 77 of the Folketing (Parliamentary) Elections Act - winning at least one constituency seat; obtaining at least the Hare quota (valid votes in province/number of constituency seats in province) in two of the three provinces; or obtaining at least 2% of the national vote - compete for compensatory seats.

Election results

Summary

(Excludes compensatory seats)

Detailed

2022
Results of the 2022 general election held on 1 November 2022:

Votes per municipality:<

The following candidates were elected:
 Constituency seats - Carsten Bach (I), 2,103 votes; Thomas Danielsen (V), 8,923 votes; Dennis Flydtkjær (Æ), 7,501 votes; Mads Fuglede (V), 8,428 votes; Søren Gade (V), 22,813 votes; Mogens Jensen (A), 6,413 votes; Thomas Jensen (A), 5,803 votes; Betina Kastbjerg (Æ), 2,037 votes; Annette Lind (A), 9,797 votes; Signe Munk (F), 8,032 votes; Anne Paulin (A), 6,905 votes; Søren Pape Poulsen (C), 15,767 votes; and Jeppe Søe (M), 2,452 votes.
 Compensatory seats - Lise Bertelsen (C), 1,894 votes.

2019
Results of the 2019 general election held on 5 June 2019:

Votes per municipality:

The following candidates were elected:
 Constituency seats - Thomas Danielsen (V), 11,121 votes; Dennis Flydtkjær (O), 4,622 votes; Kristian Jensen (V), 14,302 votes; Mogens Jensen (A), 13,525 votes; Thomas Jensen (A), 12,800 votes; Carsten Kissmeyer (V), 9,359 votes; Annette Lind (A), 21,250 votes; Kristian Pihl Lorentzen (V), 9,751 votes; Signe Munk (F), 6,285 votes; Anne Paulin (A), 11,435 votes; Søren Pape Poulsen (C), 25,062 votes; Andreas Steenberg (B), 4,444 votes; and Inger Støjberg (V), 37,285 votes.
 Compensatory seats - Orla Østerby (C), 1,239 votes; Jakob Sølvhøj (Ø), 3,645 votes; and Alex Vanopslagh (I), 3,337 votes.

2015
Results of the 2015 general election held on 18 June 2015:

Votes per municipality:

The following candidates were elected:
 Constituency seats - Thomas Danielsen (V), 10,850 votes; Karina Due (O), 8,096 votes; Dennis Flydtkjær (O), 20,768 votes; Karin Gaardsted (A), 11,377 votes; Kristian Jensen (V), 17,728 votes; Mogens Jensen (A), 14,667 votes; Thomas Jensen (A), 13,462 votes; Christian Langballe (O), 10,779 votes; Esben Lunde Larsen (V), 12,831 votes; Annette Lind (A), 20,804 votes; Kristian Pihl Lorentzen (V), 10,142 votes; Leif Mikkelsen (I), 10,477 votes; and Inger Støjberg (V), 20,380 votes.
 Compensatory seats - René Gade (Å), 4,065 votes; Søren Pape (C), 13,231 votes; Jakob Sølvhøj (Ø), 3,674 votes; and Andreas Steenberg (B), 4,061 votes.

2011
Results of the 2011 general election held on 15 September 2011:

Votes per municipality:

The following candidates were elected:
 Constituency seats - Dennis Flydtkjær (O), 8,591 votes; Karin Gaardsted (A), 11,495 votes; Steen Gade (F), 6,421 votes; Kristian Jensen (V), 24,082 votes; Mogens Jensen (A), 11,646 votes; Thomas Jensen (A), 12,991 votes; Christian Langballe (O), 6,229 votes; Esben Lunde Larsen (V), 13,127 votes; Annette Lind (A), 9,668 votes; Kristian Pihl Lorentzen (V), 14,264 votes; Mads Rørvig (V), 13,387 votes; Andreas Steenberg (B), 6,499 votes; and Inger Støjberg (V), 23,066 votes.
 Compensatory seats - Thomas Danielsen (V), 7,814 votes; Lars Dohn (Ø), 972 votes; and Leif Mikkelsen (I), 9,037 votes.

2007
Results of the 2007 general election held on 13 November 2007:

Votes per municipality:

The following candidates were elected:
 Constituency seats - Søren Gade (V), 32,219 votes; Steen Gade (F), 10,212 votes; Christian Hansen (O), 17,338 votes; Kristian Jensen (V), 24,963 votes; Mogens Jensen (A), 10,421 votes; Thomas Jensen (A), 12,288 votes; Per Ørum Jørgensen (C), 5,219 votes; Jens Kirk (V), 9,354 votes; Jesper Langballe (O), 8,430 votes; Kristian Pihl Lorentzen (V), 11,500 votes; Jens Christian Lund (A), 15,443 votes; Helge Sander (V), 9,989 votes; Inger Støjberg (V), 17,654 votes; and Jens Peter Vernersen (A), 8,894 votes.
 Compensatory seats - Johannes Poulsen (B), 5,620 votes; and Kristen Touborg (F), 9,842 votes.

References

Folketing constituency
Folketing constituencies
Folketing constituencies established in 2007